The artists in The Aesthetics of Resistance, of which there is a multitude that Peter Weiss included in his novel The Aesthetics of Resistance, form a kind of musée imaginaire (imagined museum) with more than a hundred named artists and just as many works of art, mainly visual arts and literature, but also performing arts and music.

List of artists
The following list is a supplement to the list of artworks in The Aesthetics of Resistance and contains about one hundred names of artists who are discussed, named, enumerated or included in detail in the novel. They are largely arranged in the order of their appearance in the book. Exceptions are motifs, which are given a more detailed description on later pages after a brief mention.

See also
 Works of art in The Aesthetics of Resistance

References

Bibliography

 
 
 
 

Lists of artists